Rita Lafontaine   (8 June 1939  – 4 April 2016) was a Canadian theatre, film, and television actor. Born in Trois-Rivières, Quebec. She has been described as the muse of playwright Michel Tremblay and director André Brassard. Her career spanned over fifty years and left an "indelible mark on Québec theatre, film and television".  She is a four-time recipient of the Gémeaux Award; three times for Best Lead Actress and once for Best Supporting Actress. She was named an Officer of the Order of Canada in 2005 and an Officer of the National Order of Quebec in 2011.

Early life
Lafontaine was born on 8 June 1939 in Trois-Rivières, Quebec.

Career
In the 1960s, Lafontaine joined the Mouvement Contemporain and worked closely with playwright Michel Tremblay and director André Brassard. In 1966, the trio produced Cinq, an early version of En pièces détachées at Le Patriote-en-Haut in Montreal. Their first professionally produced show was Les Belles-sœurs which premiered at the Théâtre du Rideau Vert in 1968. It remains the group's most popular and translated work. Gaëtan Charlebois from the Canadian Theatre Encyclopedia noted that the play "changed much of what was believed to be Quebec culture; language, the form of theatre, which plays should be done at which theatres, the displacing of the Old Guard."

Later that year, Lafontaine performed in L'École des bouffons, directed by Brassard and written by Michel de Ghelderode, at the Centre du Théâtre d'Aujourd'hui. Other notable shows include Double Jeu by Françoise Loranger at Théâtre de la Comédie-Canadienne in 1969, and Le Pays du dragon by Tennessee Williams at the Théâtre de Quat'Sous in 1972.

In 2010, Lafontaine assisted in establishing a certificate program in theatrical interpretation at l'Université du Québec à Trois-Rivières.

Personal life and death
Lafontaine married Jacques Dufour and together they had a  daughter, Elsa Lessonini, who died of cancer in 2013. Lafontaine died on 4 April 2016 from complications while undergoing surgery for an intestinal condition.

Filmography

Honours and awards

References

External links

Rita Lafontaine fonds (R13871) at Library and Archives Canada. While the description of the fonds is in English, most of the files are in French.

Officers of the Order of Canada
1939 births
2016 deaths
Canadian stage actresses
Canadian television actresses
Canadian film actresses